Joseph Steven Lacob (born January 10, 1956) is an American business executive who is a partner at Kleiner Perkins and the majority owner of the Golden State Warriors of the National Basketball Association (NBA).

Early life and education
Lacob grew up in a Jewish family in New Bedford, Massachusetts. The Lacob family relocated to Anaheim, California and Joe switched his allegiance to the Los Angeles Lakers and the Los Angeles Angels.

Lacob earned a bachelor's degree in biological sciences from University of California, Irvine in 1978, master's degree in public health (epidemiology) from University of California, Los Angeles (UCLA) and an MBA from the Stanford Graduate School of Business.

Professional career
Lacob has been a partner at Kleiner Perkins, a Venture capital investing firm, since 1987. His investments have centered around firms involved in life sciences, medical technology, Internet and energy, and such enterprises as AutoTrader.com, Align Technology and NuVasive. Before he joined Kleiner Perkins, Lacob held executive positions with Cetus Corporation (now Chiron), FHP International (a health maintenance organization) and the management-consulting firm of Booz, Allen & Hamilton.  In interviews, he has credited his epidemiology degree for giving him a background in statistics that has fed the statistical side of his longstanding sports interest.

He was a primary investor in the American Basketball League, a professional women's basketball league that eventually folded from failure to compete successfully with its rival, the Women's National Basketball Association (WNBA). In January 2006 he became part-owner of the Celtics, where he became a co-investor with H. Irving Grousbeck, an entrepreneur and a professor at the Stanford Graduate School of Business.  

On July 15, 2010, Lacob and the group of investors he headed agreed to buy the Golden State Warriors of the NBA from Chris Cohan for $450 million, requiring him to sell his minority interest in the Celtics. The Lacob - Peter Guber group won out over a dozen other bidders for the Warriors, including Oracle chief executive officer Larry Ellison, 24-Hour Fitness founder Mark Mastrov and Texas billionaire financier David Bonderman.  He had been a Warriors' season-ticket-holder for about a decade. He already had extensive experience operating an NBA team as part-owner of the Boston Celtics, and also points to his friendships with two major league baseball team general managers, Billy Beane of the Oakland Athletics and Jeff Moorad of the San Diego Padres, who have both proven that winning records are not solely related to the size of the team payroll.  Lacob approved the acquisitions of David Lee and undrafted rookie guard Jeremy Lin, a hometown favorite. He also fired coach Don Nelson and replaced him with assistant coach Keith Smart. The sale was unanimously approved by the NBA league's board of governors on November 12, 2010.  Lacob and Peter Guber are the chief owners, but Lacob is in charge of day-to-day operations.

Before the 2014-15 NBA season, Lacob fired coach Mark Jackson who had just led the Warriors to the playoffs in consecutive seasons. Lacob explained the decision at a conference of fellow venture capitalists: "Part of it was, he couldn't get along with anybody else in the organization. And, look, he did a great job -- and I'll always compliment him in many respects -- but you can't have 200 other people in the organization not like you."

Lacob generated some controversy by calling his team "light years" ahead of everybody else in the NBA during the 2015-16 NBA season.  The Warriors won championships in the 2014-15 NBA season, 2016-17 NBA season, 2017-18 NBA season, and the 2021-22 NBA season. During his tenure with the Warriors, the team has attained the NBA records for the best regular season with 73–9 and most wins in a season (regular season and postseason combined) with 88 in 2015–16, as well as best postseason with 16–1 (.941 winning percentage) in 2016–17.

As of 2022, Joe Lacob's net worth is $1.5 billion, according to Forbes.

Personal life
Lacob is divorced  from his first wife, Laurie (née Kraus), with whom he has two sons and two daughters. He is currently married to Nicole Curran.

References

1956 births
Living people
Golden State Warriors owners
Jewish American sportspeople
University of California, Irvine alumni
UCLA School of Public Health alumni
Stanford Graduate School of Business alumni
Sportspeople from New Bedford, Massachusetts
Kleiner Perkins people
21st-century Jews
American billionaires